Hany Ramzy may refer to:
 Hany Ramzy, Egyptian footballer
 Hany Ramzy (actor), Egyptian actor and comedian